The Meriden Rural District was a rural district of Warwickshire, England, which existed between 1894 and 1974. It was named after the village of Meriden.

Various boundary changes occurred to the district over the years. It gained area from the abolished Castle Bromwich Rural District in 1912.  In 1932 it was enlarged by the abolition of the Nuneaton Rural District the Foleshill Rural District and the Solihull Rural District.  It also lost territory as the county boroughs of Solihull and Coventry expanded their boundaries.

The district was abolished in 1974 under the Local Government Act 1972.  Part of it to the south was merged with the Solihull county borough to become part of the new Metropolitan Borough of Solihull in the new West Midlands county. Part of it to the north was merged with the Atherstone Rural District to become part of North Warwickshire.

At the time of its abolition in 1974 Meriden RD consisted of the following civil parishes:

Allesley
Balsall 
Barston
Berkswell
Bickenhill  
Castle Bromwich 
Chelmsley Wood 
Coleshill 
Corley
Coundon 
Curdworth 
Fillongley 
Fordbridge
Great Packington 
Hampton-in-Arden 
Keresley
Kingshurst 
Kinwalsey
Lea Marston 
Little Packington
Maxstoke 
Meriden 
Middleton 
Minworth 
Nether Whitacre 
Over Whitacre 
Sheldon 
Shustoke  
Water Orton 
Wishaw

External links
Visionofbritain – Used as reference

History of Warwickshire
Local government in Warwickshire
History of the West Midlands (county)
Districts of England created by the Local Government Act 1894
Districts of England abolished by the Local Government Act 1972
Rural districts of England